Ust-Buzulukskaya is a rural locality (a stanitsa) and the administrative center of Ust-Buzulukskoye Rural Settlement, Alexeyevsky District, Volgograd Oblast, Russia. The population was 2,364 as of 2010. There are 32 streets.

Geography 
Ust-Buzulukskaya is located on the right bank of the Khopyor River, 20 km south of Alexeyevskaya (the district's administrative centre) by road. Lunyakinsky is the nearest rural locality.

References 

Rural localities in Alexeyevsky District, Volgograd Oblast